"Woodshedding", or shedding, is a term commonly used by musicians to mean rehearsing a difficult passage repeatedly until it can be performed flawlessly.  The term is used metaphorically where "the woodshed" means any private place to practice without being heard by anyone else. This is based on the assumption that an actual woodshed would likely be in a remote location, away from the main house.

In jazz music 

In jazz lingo, woodshedding is often shortened to 'shed or 'shedding. According to Paul Klemperer, a Texas-based jazz educator, woodshedding is more than just practicing— it is "the place where you work out the techniques that form the foundation of your improvisational ability".

In barbershop singing

In barbershop music, woodshedding can mean starting only with a melody and working out harmonies by ear without benefit of notated music.

Other uses

In legal parlance, "woodshedding" refers to the instruction given to a witness to make him respond in one party's favor. It is the act of impermissibly coaching a witness or unfairly prejudicing him during ex parte communications. This fits with the concept of the metaphor of a "woodshed" being a private place where such conspiracy might occur.  It is also called "horse shedding" and involves practice questions and answers or even a mock trial.  Such tactics can have an impact on a witness's memory, which is malleable and suggestible.

References

External links
Example sentences on Wikipedia using the word "woodshedding"

Musical terminology